Charles Crawford (born March 8, 1964) is a former American football running back who played for two seasons in the National Football League (NFL). He played for the Philadelphia Eagles from 1986–1987. He was drafted by the Eagles with a supplemental seventh round draft pick in the 1986 NFL Supplemental Draft. He played college football at Oklahoma State.

References

1964 births
Living people
People from Bristow, Oklahoma
Players of American football from Oklahoma
American football running backs
Oklahoma State Cowboys football players
Philadelphia Eagles players